Hands Like Houses are an Australian rock band from Canberra. Formed in 2008, the group is currently signed to Hopeless Records and UNFD. Their debut album, Ground Dweller, was released on 13 March 2012 and charted at number 141 on the Billboard Top 200 and number 2 on the Billboard Heatseekers Chart. Their second album, Unimagine, was released on 23 July 2013, during their route on Warped Tour. The band's third album, Dissonants was released on 26 February 2016, followed by their fourth, Anon, on 12 October 2018.

History

Formation and Ground Dweller (2008–2013)
Formed in 2008 from the remnants of other local bands, So Long Safety and Eternal Debut, the band traveled to Chango Studios to record material to record Ground Dweller (which began as an EP, as stated by Woodley) with producer Cameron Mizell. However, the EP never was released and the band decided to re-record some of the tracks and record six new tracks for a full-length album.  In 2011, the band released singles for "This Ain't No Place for Animals" and "Lion Skin" (which features a few differences from the one included in their full-length) on iTunes, garnering over 5,000 single sales. They also released a demo version of "One Hundred" in their PureVolume profile.

In January 2012 the band signed with Rise Records and released Ground Dweller, in March, streaming the entire album on the Alternative Press website. Ground Dweller debuted at No. 141 on the Billboard Top 200 and number 2 on the Billboard Heatseekers Chart. and has been generally well received. On 2 May, Hands Like Houses embarked on their first ever tour of the US on Rise Records' The Freshman Class of 12 Tour, supporting The Air I Breathe, Palisades and My Ticket Home.

In April 2012 released a video EP named Snow Sessions with acoustic performances of some songs from Ground Dweller. They toured in the United States with We Came as Romans and Attack Attack!, and in the fall of 2012 with Pierce the Veil and Sleeping with Sirens on the Collide with the Sky Tour. They joined Pierce the Veil and Woe, Is Me of May/June 2013.

Unimagine and Reimagine (2013–2014)
During a UK tour with Pierce the Veil and Woe, Is Me, Hands Like Houses performed new songs from Unimagine, including the lead single "Introduced Species". The album was released in July via Rise Records. The band performed on the entire 2013 Vans Warped Tour on the #Domo Stage., performing 'Introduced Species' and 'Shapeshifters' off the new album for the duration of the tour. The band released a video during this time for 'A Fire on a Hill', featuring a time lapse of an evolving mural painted by local Canberra artists Alex Lundy & Clare Jackson.

In 2014, the band went on multiple tours to support Unimagine. During February–March they supported Memphis May Fire across the USA with The Word Alive, A Skylit Drive and Beartooth, then completed their first UK headline tour in April supported by Crooks (UK). On returning to the US in late April, the band supported Chiodos on the remaining dates of their 'Devil's Dance' tour, alongside Emarosa, Our Last Night and '68. In May, the band commenced their first headline run of the USA, supported by Slaves (Jonny Craig), Miss Fortune and Alive Like Me, before returning to Australia for a string of headline shows supported by Forever Ends Here, Breakaway and Far Away Stables. During this period, the band released their third music video for 'A Tale of Outer Suburbia', directed by Joshua Aylett.

After a brief break, in September 2014 the band announced a new EP of alternative versions from their previous album, Unimagine. As revealed by the band, Reimagine is a parallel and a rediscovery of Unimagine and we couldn’t be happier with the result." The E.P. was released 16 September 2014. Along with the announcement they released videos for each song from the EP, leading with "Revive (Introduced Species)". Keyboardist Jamal Sabet quietly left the band sometime in December to pursue other endeavors. To conclude their year, the band toured across the UK and Europe with British metalcore band Bury Tomorrow, with Slaves and In Hearts Wake supporting on the UK dates.

Dissonants (2015–2017)

In 2015 Hands Like Houses performed on Silverstein's Discovering the Waterfront 10 Year Anniversary Tour, alongside Beartooth, Major League and My Iron Lung. Prior to beginning the tour, the band recorded a new standalone single "I Am" with Erik Ron at Grey Area Studios in LA. On 12 March, the band teased a 30-second clip of a video clip for "I Am", produced by Megan Thompson, with the single to be released on 17 March. However, the band released the music video two days early on YouTube. The band entered the studio in March, recording their third album with James Paul Wisner (Underoath, Paramore, Go Radio, The Getaway Plan) in St Cloud, FL. The album was released by Rise Records and UNFD, and was originally given a tentative release set for October 2015. The band toured on that year's Vans Warped Tour. They debuted a new song "New Romantics" as part of their set. Hands Like Houses appeared on the UK's renowned Download Festival in mid-June, as well as the entire US Vans Warped Tour in June–August. In addition, they have been announced as main support for Enter Shikari's Australian leg of The Mindsweep World Tour.

On 11 August the band announced via Facebook that their new album is called Dissonants and will be released some time this October, and also announced a world tour. The band released the second single from Dissonants, "New Romantics", previously debuted while the band was on Warped Tour, in October. The band later debuted two new songs while on their Dissonants World Tour, "Glasshouse" and "Perspectives". In December, Hands Like Houses filled in for The Ghost Inside on the "Big Ass Tour" with A Day to Remember, The Amity Affliction, and Motionless in White after members of The Ghost Inside were injured in a bus crash. Later that month they announced pre-orders for their album would go on sale.

Dissonants was then released on 26 February 2016. A few days later, the band also announced that they will be joining Northlane and In Hearts Wake on their The Equinox Tour in Australia in June 2016. They also supported Northlane on their Intuition Tour in Australia in May 2017, and once again performed on the Warped Tour in the US in the summer of 2017. On 15 June 2017, the band released a standalone single "Drift" and announced that they had signed to Hopeless Records worldwide excluding Australia and New Zealand, where their partnership with UNFD continues.

Anon (2018–2020)

During the start of 2018, the band appeared at UNIFY festival in Tarwin Lower, as well as embarked on the Resonants acoustic tour. On 26 July, the band announced they would be releasing their fourth studio album, Anon, set to be released on 12 October through Hopeless Records. The album's first single, "Overthinking", was also released on the same day. Four days later the band announced dates for a headlining tour across North America with Emarosa and Devour the Day. The album's second single, "Monster", was released on 13 August. On 1 October, WWE announced that "Monster" would be the official theme song for the WWE Super Show-Down pay-per-view on 6 October in Melbourne. The band released their fourth studio album Anon on 12 October 2018 via UNFD. Wall of Sound reviewer Michael Parente scored the album 7.5/10 saying "this album is a refreshing take on the genre, with tight songwriting"

Their third single from Anon, "Sick", was released on 22 January 2019, alongside its accompanying music video. Hands Like Houses performed a national six-date tour to promote the album for February. They played across the major capital cities. Playing as support for the band was Ocean Grove, Endless Heights, and RedHook. On 24 July they released a remixed version of their track "Through Glass" with Samsaruh providing additional vocals. They are expected to perform a tour across regional Australia in October.

Self-titled EP (2020–present)
In August 2020, the band announced alongside the release "The Water" that they would be releasing their self-titled EP containing previously released single "Space" on October 23rd 2020. The EP released  through UNFD records to generally positive reviews.

Controversy
In September of 2021, Hands Like Houses was dropped by UNFD Records due to “serious allegations” against one of the members. Front man Trenton Woodly released a statement saying “The band is aware of the allegations and is taking them seriously.” The band and label are legally prohibited from releasing details on the allegations for the time being. Trenton Woodley also said the band would release a statement when they are legally allowed to. 

On July 7, 2022, UNFD issued a statement about Hands Like Houses, mentioning that the case was resolved and the allegations were proven false. The band posted a response to the statement the following day.

Band members

Current members
 Trenton Woodley – lead vocals , keyboards, programming 
 Matt Cooper – lead guitar 
 Alexander Pearson – rhythm guitar, backing vocals 
 Joel Tyrrell – bass guitar, backing vocals 
 Matt Parkitny – drums 

Former members
 Jamal Sabet – keyboards, programming

Discography

Studio albums

Extended plays

Singles

Guest appearances

Collaborations

Awards and nominations

National Live Music Awards
The National Live Music Awards (NLMAs) are a broad recognition of Australia's diverse live industry, celebrating the success of the Australian live scene. The awards commenced in 2016.

|-
|2017
| Hands Like Houses
| Best Live Act of the Year - People's Choice
| 
|-
| 2019
| Hands Like Houses
| Live Hard Rock Act of the Year
| 
|-

References

External links
 

Australian post-hardcore musical groups
Musical quintets
Musical groups established in 2006
Rise Records artists
Australian Capital Territory musical groups